Cheraghabad (also Romanized as Cherāghābād) is a village in Sar Firuzabad Rural District, Firuzabad District, Kermanshah County, Kermanshah Province, Iran. At the 2006 census, its population was 53, in 10 families.

References 

Populated places in Kermanshah County